Kenneth A. Kermack (1919 – 2000) was a British palaeontologist at University College London most notable for his work on early mammals with his wife, Doris Mary Kermack.

Among Kermack's other significant contributions was the observation that Diplodocus could not have had an aquatic lifestyle because sheer water pressure alone on its chest would have prevented it breathing whilst submerged.

He first described the early mammal Aegialodon dawsoni from a molar tooth and the docodont Simpsonodon oxfordensis.
He was also interested in astronomy, elected a member of the British Astronomical Association 1966 February 23, a member until his death.

Selected publications
 Kermack, D. M., Kermack, K. A., and Mussett, F. 1968. The Welsh pantothere Kuehneotherium praecursoris. Journal of the Linnean Society of London, Zoology 47:407–423.
 Kermack, K. A., Mussett, F., and Rigney, H. W. 1973. The lower jaw of Morganucodon. Zoological Journal of the Linnean Society 53:87–175.
 Kermack, K. A., Mussett, F., and Rigney, H. W. 1981. The skull of Morganucodon. Zoological Journal of the Linnean Society 71:1–158.
 Kermack, K. 1989. Hearing in early mammals. Nature 341:568–569.

References

British palaeontologists
1919 births
2000 deaths